Lucas Ramón Ojeda Villanueva (born 1 February 1986) is an Argentine footballer that currently plays Sol de América de Formosa in the Torneo Federal A of Argentina.

Honours

Club
San Martín de Tucumán
 Primera B Nacional: 2007–08

Universitario de Sucre
 Torneo Clausura: 2014

External links
 
 

1986 births
Living people
Argentine footballers
Argentine expatriate footballers
Club Atlético Independiente footballers
San Martín de Tucumán footballers
Rangers de Talca footballers
O'Higgins F.C. footballers
Deportes Iquique footballers
Expatriate footballers in Chile
Association football forwards
People from Formosa, Argentina